"Something to Believe In" is a song by Irish group Clannad and American musician Bruce Hornsby. It was the first single released by Clannad from their 1987 album Sirius. A promotional video for the single was directed by Meiert Avis, using the radio edit of the song.

Track listing

7" (PB 41543)
 "Something to Believe In"
 "Second Nature"

12" (PT 41544)
 "Something to Believe In"
 "Second Nature"
 "In A Lifetime"

External links
 Video

Clannad songs
1987 singles
Bruce Hornsby songs